Homan may refer to:

Places
 Homan, Iran, a village in Yazd Province, Iran
 Homan Bay, Nunavut, Canada
 Homan (CTA Green Line station)
 Homan Square Police Warehouse in Chicago

Other uses
 Homan (surname)
 Homan (1884), Belarusian newspaper
 Homan (1916), Belarusian newspaper

See also
Homann
Hohmann (disambiguation)